Johan Cristian Meriluoto (born 22 March 1974, in Porvoo) is a male triple jumper from Finland.

He finished ninth at the 1998 European Championships and tenth at the 2001 World Championships. He also competed at the 1999 World Championships and the 2005 World Championships without reaching the final.

Achievements

References 

1974 births
Living people
Finnish male triple jumpers
People from Porvoo
Sportspeople from Uusimaa